A premetro is a tramway or light railway which includes segments built to rapid transit standards, generally as part of a process of conversion to a metro-standards railway usually by the construction of tunnels in the central city area.

History
The first city to carry a portion of a streetcar line through the city center in a tunnel was Marseille, France, in 1893, with its Noailles subterranean station (see Marseille tramway). It was initially operated by horse-drawn wagons. The next prominent example was the Tremont Street subway (1897) in Boston, today part of the MBTA Green Line. These early tunnels were intended solely to reduce streetcar congestion on surface streets, not for later conversion to metro service. Several early streetcar tunnels, including the Steinway Tunnel and East Boston Tunnel, were later converted to metro operation. However, the small loading gauge, tight curves, and steep grades of the streetcar tunnels required smaller metro cars than otherwise desirable.

Second generation
The modern premetro concept Stadtbahn began in 1960s Germany, as rising traffic congestion due to auto ownership led to the construction of new transit systems. Rather than building costly metro lines immediately, some cities built only the downtown tunnels. They could be used by existing tram lines in the short term, with the intention of full metro conversion later - hence "pre-metro". The idea spread to other European countries in the 1970s, especially Belgium, where such systems were explicitly named premetros.

Examples 

 Antwerp Pre-metro in Belgium
 Brussels Pre-metro in Belgium
 Charleroi Metro in Belgium
 Vienna Pre-metro in Austria
 Trams in The Hague
 Nanhai Tram Line 1 in Foshan, Guangdong, China

See also 
Medium-capacity rail system
 Stadtbahn
 Train categories in Europe

References 

Light rail
Tram transport
Rapid transit